Tower Mountain is a  peak in British Columbia, Canada. 
It is part of the Tower of London Range of the Muskwa Ranges in the Canadian Rockies.

Tower Mountain  overlooks the south end of Wokkpash Lake.
It is named after the Tower of London.
Other mountains in the area are also named after the tower, including South Bastion Mountain, North Bastion Mountain and  The White Tower.  These names were given by the Royal Fusiliers (City of London Regiment) Canadian Rocky Mountains Expedition 1960, a small expedition with members from a regiment based in the Tower of London.

References
Citations

Sources

Two-thousanders of British Columbia
Canadian Rockies
Peace River Land District